Henry Carter may refer to:

 Henry A. P. Carter (1837–1891), American diplomat in the Kingdom of Hawaii
 Harry Carter Stuart (1893–1963), Virginia cattleman and state senator
 Henry H. Carter (1905–2001), American linguistics professor
 Henry John Carter (1813–1895), surgeon, geologist and zoologist
 Henry Stuart Carter (1910–1985), Virginia lawyer and state delegate
 Henry Vandyke Carter (1831–1897), English surgeon and anatomical artist
 Frank Leslie (1821–1880), born Henry Carter, English-American publisher and illustrator

See also

Harry Carter (disambiguation)